Fabien Cordeau (March 24, 1923 – September 27, 2007) was a politician in Quebec, Canada.

Background

He was born on March 24, 1923 in Saint-Pie, Quebec.

City Councillor

Cordeau served as a city councillor in Saint-Hyacinthe from 1973 to 1988.

Member of the legislature

He ran as a Union Nationale candidate to the provincial legislature in the district of Saint-Hyacinthe in the 1976 election and won against both Liberal incumbent Fernand Cornellier and Parti Québécois (PQ) candidate Charles-Henri Tremblay.  He lost the 1981 election against PQ candidate Maurice Dupré.

Death

Cordeau died on September 27, 2007.

References

1923 births
2007 deaths
Union Nationale (Quebec) MNAs